Nishinotani Dam  is a gravity dam located in Kagoshima Prefecture in Japan. The dam is used for flood control. The catchment area of the dam is 6.8 km2. The dam can store 793 thousand cubic meters of water. The construction of the dam was started on 1990 and completed in 2012.

See also
List of dams in Japan

References

Dams in Kagoshima Prefecture